Zoltán Szabó may refer to:
Zoltán Szabó (botanist) (1882–1944), floristics, plant systematics, plant physiology
Zoltán Szabó (mathematician) (born 1965), Hungarian mathematician and professor at Princeton University
Zoltán Szabó (Minister of Defence) (1858–1934), Hungarian politician and Minister of Defence of Hungary
Zoltán Szabó (surgeon) (1929–2015), Hungarian cardiac surgeon
Zoltan Sabo (born 1972), Serbian-born Hungarian football manager and retired player
Zoltán Szabó (footballer, born 1980), Hungarian football player
Zoltán Szabó (serial killer), Hungarian serial killer